Margherita Servetto (born 1957), better known as Mara, is an Italian architect and designer.

Biography 
She studied at the Polytechnic University of Turin, where she received her degree in architecture under the supervision of Achille Castiglioni. When Castiglioni obtained a teaching position at the Polytechnic University of Milan, she moved to Milan in order to collaborate with Castiglioni, which she did until 1990.

In the early 1990s, she worked on research, architectural, and design projects alongside Ico Migliore. In 1992, she designed some objects for Alessi. In the meantime, she developed researches and trials on the use of fiberglass both in architecture and design. Moreover, together with Ico Migliore and Giovanna Piccinno, she began to produce “AA.VV. Autorivari” objects, which started to be distributed in Italy.

In 1997 she co-founded with her husband, Ico Migliore, Migliore + Servetto Architects, an architecture firm which creates, together with an international team of architects and designers, projects on various scales: from architecture to interior design; from urban design to temporary exhibitions; from museum to communication projects. These projects, diversified as they are, create innovative places that have a major impact on people. Architectures, interior and exhibition design projects characterized by an expressive use of light and new technologies.

She has been awarded many international prizes, such as the XXI (2008), XXIII (2014), XXV (2018) ADI Compasso d’Oro (Ita), five Honorable Mentions ADI Compasso d’Oro (Ita), eleven Red Dot Design Award (Ger), two German Design Award (Ger), two FX Interior Design Award (UK), the Annual Exhibit Design Award (Usa), two International Design Award (Usa) and the ASAL Exhibition Design of the Year (Ita).
 
Mara Servetto is visiting professor at Tokyo Joshibi University of Art and Design.

Main works

Museums 
ADI Design Museum Compasso d’Oro, Milan, in progress
Layout of the "History of Mankind" section, Milan Natural History Museum, Milan (2019)
Logo and Corporate Identity, Miramare Historical Museum and Castle Park, Trieste (2019)
MIC-International Museum of the Shoe “Pietro Bertolini”, Vigevano, 2016
Leonardiana. A New Museum", Vigevano, 2016
Logo and Corporate Identity, Museo Egizio, Turin, 2014/2015
“A building site as an event”, Museo Egizio, Turin, 2012/2015
Pesaro City Art Museum, Palazzo Mosca, Pesaro, 2013
Intesa Sanpaolo Bank Savings Museum, Turin, 2012
Chopin Muzeum, Warsaw, 2010

Solo exhibitions 
As a result of more than 20 years of research in interior and spatial design, she has held several solo exhibitions, mainly with Migliore + Servetto Architects, including: 
“Lightmorphing. From Sign to Scenery” (2019) in South Korea at the Onground Gallery in Seoul and at the Art SoHyang Gallery in Busan;
“Red Light Architecture - Sketches and Notes on Projects” (2018) at the Dongdaemun Design Plaza (DDP) in Seoul (South Korea); 
“Spacemorphing” in Tokyo, Japan (2007), in Turin, Italy (2008), in Seoul, South Korea (2010).

Exhibitions
Italian Pavilion “4 Elements / Taking Care”, Milan Triennial 2019 “Broken Nature: Design Takes on Human Survival”, Triennale di Milano, Milan (2019)
Abitare il Paese / Open Nests for CNAPPC (National Italian Council of Planners, Designers and Conservators), part of Interni "Human Spaces" exhibition at University of Milan for Fuori Salone - (Milan Furniture Fair), 2019
The Perfect Time for Whirlpool, part of Interni "Human Spaces" exhibition at University of Milan for Fuori Salone - (Milan Furniture Fair), 2019
Iulm 50. Legacy and Future, for IULM, Milan, 2019
La Magnifica Fabbrica. 240 Years of Teatro alla Scala from Piermarini to Botta, Museo Teatrale alla Scala, Milan, 2019 (together with I. Lupi)
Achille Castiglioni Visionary, Chiasso m.a.x museo, 2018
Michelangelo's Medici Madonna, for the Bank of Korea, Busan, 2018
Coats! Max Mara Seoul 2017, for Max Mara, Dongdaemun Design Plaza (DDP), Seoul, 2017
Steve Jobs o Visionário, Rio de Janeiro Pier Mauá and São Paulo Museum of Image and Sound, 2017
Madonna della Misericordia by Piero della Francesca, Palazzo Marino, Milan, 2016
The Art of Living, RCS, Palazzo della Permanente, Milan, 2016
B&B Italia / The Perfect Density, for B&B Italia, Triennale di Milano, Milan, 2016
In Equilibrio - HERB RITTS, Palazzo della Ragione, Milan, 2016
Bellissima. L'Italia dell'alta moda 1945–1968, Royal Villa of Monza, 2015
Moreschi Walking Pleasure, for Moreschi, Triennale di Milano, Milan, 2015
Tecno Lively Table, for Tecno, Piazza XXV Aprile, Milan, 2015
Alcantara Chromophone, Alcantara Technology of dreams, Palazzo Reale, Milan, 2015 (together with I. Lupi) 
RCS, The Art of Living, Triennale di Milano, Milan, 2015
Shooting Stars, LACMA, Los Angeles, 2015
Immortals – The Art and Knowledge of the Ancient Egyptians, Museo Egizio, Turin, 2013/2015
Trame – Copper Crossing in Contemporary Art, Design, Technology and Architecture, Triennale di Milano, Milan 2014
RCS, The Art of Living & Volvo Cloud Installation, Triennale di Milano, Milan, 2014
Meet Design: Around the World, Triennale di Milano, Milan, 2013
Pablo Picasso. Artworks from the Musee National Picasso in Paris at Palazzo Reale, Palazzo Reale, Milan, 2013 (together with I.Lupi)
Constancy & Change in Korean Traditional Craft, Triennale di Milano, Milan, 2013
Altagamma Italian Contemporary Excellence, Triennale di Milano, Milan, 2012/2013
Coats! Max Mara 60 Years of Italian Fashion. Travelling exhibition: Berlin Kulturforum (2006), Tokyo Mori Art Museum (2007), Beijing National Art Museum of China (NAMOC) (2008), Moscow State Historical Museum (2012)
Bticino Slim And White Axolute Code, Milan, 2010
Seeing The Light, for the New York Times Style Magazine, Bulgari Hotel, Milan, 2008
Sensidivini, Triennale di Milano, Milan, 2004
Drawing Dreams:  Dante Ferretti, Production Designer, LACMA, Los Angeles, 2002
Krizia Moving Shapes, Museum of Contemporary Art Tokyo (MOT), 2001 (together with I.Lupi)
Tod's Driving Dreams, Former Riva Workshops, Milan, 2001
Wallpaper* Urban Addition, Spazio Hogan, Milan, 2001
Wallpaper* + Giorgio Armani 60 Architecture Models, Former Nestlé Building, Milan, 2000

Fair design
Puglia Crossing Identities, MADE expo, Rho Fiera, Milan 2017
space&interiors by MADE expo, The Mall, Porta Nuova, Milan, 2017
Pedrali Urban Life, Pedrali, Salone del Mobile, Rho Fiera, Milan, 2016
space&interiors by MADE expo, The Mall, Porta Nuova, Milan, 2016
Accademia Citterio, Pavilion, EXPO, Milan 2015
Moreschi Caleidoscopes, Pitti Uomo, Florence, 2015
Pedrali Light Frames, Fiera Milan, Rho, 2015
Luceplan Lighting Promenade, Fiera Milan, Rho, 2015
Pedrali Stand Orgatec, Orgatec, Cologne, 2014
Pedrali Flying Boxes, Fiera Milan, Rho, 2014
Conai Stand, Ecomondo, Rimini, 2014

Fair design
space&interiors, for Made Expo, Milan, 2016 and 2017. Exhibition design of the entire fair area and of each individual stand
Puglia Crossing Identities, for MADE Expo, Milan 2017
Pedrali Urban Life, for Pedrali, Milan Furniture Fair, Milan, 2016
Accademia Citterio della Salumeria Italiana, for Citterio, Milan Expo 2015 Pavilion, Milan, 2015
Moreschi Caleidoscopes, Pitti Uomo Fair, Florence, 2015
Pedrali Light Frames, for Pedrali, Milan Furniture Fair, Milan, 2015
Luceplan Lighting Promenade, Milan Furniture Fair, Milan, 2015
Tecno stand, for Tecno, Caselli Piazza XXV Aprile, 2016, 2015 and 2014
Pedrali Stand Orgatec, for Pedrali, Orgatec Fair, Cologne, 2014
Pedrali Flying Boxes, for Pedrali, Milan Furniture Fair, Milan, 2014
Conai Stand, Ecomondo, Rimini, 2014
Tecno stand, for Tecno, Orgatec Fair, Cologne, 2014
Pedrali Mirror, for Pedrali, Milan Furniture Fair, Milan, 2013
Beijing Design Fair, for Rcs Media Group S.p.A., Watertank D·Park 751, Beijing, 2012. Exhibition design of the entire fair area and of each individual stands
A Wheel For Pedrali, for Pedrali, Milan Furniture Fair, Milan, 2012
Arper stand, for Arper, Milan Furniture Fair, Milan, 2009
Daedalus - 6 Ideas Scattered in a Technological Garden, Seoul Living Design Fair, Seoul, 2009
Foscarini stand, for Foscarini, Milan Furniture Fair, Milan, 2009
Fiat stand, Auto Show of Paris, Bologna, Geneva, 2008
Thonet stand, Milan Furniture Fair, Milan, 2004/2006
Charme Group Presentation (Poltrona Frau, Cappellini, Thonet, Gufram), Fuori Salone-Milan Furniture Fair, Milan, 2005
Conai stand, for Conai, at Ecomondo (Rimini Fair), IPACK-IMA (Rho Fair Milan), Iswa (Rome Fair) and Terra Futura (Florence). From 2003 to 2019

Interiors 
dmail (Percassi Group) new Headquarters, Pontassieve (Florence), 2019
dmail (Percassi Group) new Format Store, throughout Italy, 2016/2019
B&B Italia Charles 20° Anniversary, B&B Italia store, Milan, 2017
Mondadori Megastore, Il Centro Shopping Center, Arese, 2016
Mondadori new Concept Store, for Mondadori, 2015
Luceplan new Showroom, for Luceplan, Corso Monforte, Milan, 2014
SK Promotion Center, for SK Group, Beijing, 2013
Samsung Design Centre, for Samsung, Milan, 2012
BTicino Concept Store “Experience Space”, for BTicino, Milan, 2011
Mediabend Capital Headquarters, for Mediabend-Della Valle Group, New York, 2011
Banca Popolare Friuladria, Crédit agricole - Self Service Area, for Crédit Agricole FriulAdria S.p.a., Pordenone and Rovigo, 2008
Residence Desuite, Milan, 2006
Fay Concept Store, Milan, 2002

Urban design 
Blue Line Park, Busan, in progress
Expo Flags Boulevard and Palo Milano, for Milan Expo 2015, Milan, 2011/2015 (in cooperation with I.Lupi)
Torino + Light + Italian Colours, lighting Installation on the Mole Antonelliana, 2011/2012 (in cooperation with I.Lupi)
City Dressing for the 150th Anniversary of Italian Unification, Turin, 2011
City Dressing, Milan, 2010 
City Dressing, XXIII Winter Universiadi, Turin, 2007
Look of the City, XX Olympic Winter Game, Turin, 2006 (in cooperation with I.Lupi)
Corporate image and urban installations, Festival Dei Saperi, Pavia 2006/2008

Major awards 
XXV ADI Compasso d’Oro (Ita), 2018 - Permanent Exhibition, “Leonardiana. A New Museum”, Vigevano
Honorable Mention ADI Compasso d’Oro (Ita), 2018 - Temporary Exhibition, “Moreschi Walking Pleasure”
German Design Award (Ger), 2018 - Temporary Exhibition, “B&B Italia/The Perfect Density”
Red Dot Design Award (Ger), 2018 - Communication Design, “Coats! Max Mara, Seoul 2017” 
International Design Award (IDA) (USA), 2016 - Product Design, "i-Mesh Lightweight Diffuser Ceilings"
Red Dot Design Award (Ger), 2016 - Communication Design, “Bellissima. L’Italia del’alta moda 1945-1968” 
Red Dot Design Award (Ger), 2016 - Communication Design, “Moreschi Walking Pleasure”
Red Dot Design Award (Ger), 2016 - Communication Design, “B&B Italia/The Perfect Density”
Red Dot Design Award (Ger), 2016 - Communication Design, “Pedrali Urban Life”
Red Dot Design Award (Ger), 2015 - Communication Design, "Pedrali Light Frames"
XXIII ADI Compasso d’Oro (Ita), 2014 - Event Design, “Slim and White Axolute Code”
Honorable Mention ADI Compasso d’Oro (Ita), 2014 - Permanent Exhibition, “Chopin Museum”
Honorable Mention ADI Compasso d’Oro (Ita), 2014 - Urban Design, “Torino + Light + Italian Colours”
FX International Interior Design Award (UK), 2012 - Temporary Exhibition, "A Wheel for Pedrali"
Honorable Mention ADI Compasso d’Oro (Ita), 2014 - Temporary Exhibition, “Seeing the Light” The New York Times Style Magazine
International Design Award (IDA) (USA), 2011 - Temporary Installation, "Torino + Light + Italian Colours"
FX International Interior Design Award (UK), 2011 - Temporary Exhibition, “Seeing the Light” The New York Times Style Magazine
Red Dot Design Award (Ger), 2011 - Permanent Exhibition, “Chopin Muzeum”
Red Dot Design Award (Ger), 2011 - Communication Design, “Bticino Concept Store”
German Design Award (Ger), 2010 - Urban Design, “Look of the City. XX Olympic Winter Games 2006” 
Red Dot Design Award (Ger), 2009 - Communication Design, “Fiat Exhibition Stand 2008/2009”, Paris (France), Geneva (Switzerland)
Red Dot Design Award (Ger), 2009 - Communication Design, “Seeing the Light” The New York Times Style Magazine
Red Dot Design Award (Ger), 2009 - Communication Design, “Coats! Max Mara, 55 Years of Italian Fashion” Berlin (Germany), Tokyo (Japan), Beijing (China) 
XXI ADI Compasso d’Oro(Ita), 2008 - Urban Design, “Look of the City. XX Olympic Winter Games 2006” 
Honorable Mention ADI Compasso d’Oro (Ita), 2008 - Temporary Exhibition, “Wallpaper* Express. Da Pechino a Shanghai con Bombadier”
Annual Exhibit Design Award (USA), 2006, Wallpaper* Exhibitions 1999/2003
Asal – Exhibition Design of the Year (Ita), 2003 - Temporary Exhibition, Wallpaper* “Urban Addition”

Notes

External links
 Migliore+Servetto Architects
 Dexigner FX International Interior Design Awards

1957 births
Living people
Italian women architects
Polytechnic University of Turin alumni
Academic staff of the Polytechnic University of Milan
20th-century Italian architects
21st-century Italian architects